

Buildings

Manhattan

Bronx

Brooklyn

Vanderveer Estates Apartments nka Flatbush Gardens, Tiffany Towers nka Tivoli Towers, Ebbets Field Apartments and Towers of Bay Ridge and Rutland Rd Houses in Brooklyn, all five includes rent, gas & electric (AC including) in the lease, so it's not projects or developments owned by NYCHA, even though all five take Section 8.

Queens

Staten Island

References

External links
 Bronx - NYCHA
 Brooklyn - NYCHA
 Manhattan - NYCHA 
 Queens - NYCHA 
 Staten Island - NYCHA 
 Map of NYCHA Developments

Housing Authority properties
Housing Authority properties